Nino Cavalli Stadium is a baseball stadium located in Parma, Emilia Romagna, Italy. It is the home stadium of Parma Baseball of the Italian Baseball League.

History

The baseball stadium was opened on 12 September 2009. It has a capacity of 3,000 people.

From September 18–22, 2019, the stadium hosted games of the WBSC Baseball Europe/Africa Olympic qualifier.

References 

2009 establishments in Italy
Baseball venues in Italy
Buildings and structures in Parma
Sport in Parma
Sports venues completed in 2009
Sports venues in Emilia-Romagna